Ezra Taylor (born 6 April 1983 in Brisbane, Australia) is a New Zealand rugby union player. He began his career in the second row but now plays as a flanker or number eight.

Playing career

New Zealand
Born in Australia but raised in New Zealand, Taylor represented New Zealand at U-19 and schoolboy levels and made his debut for Otago in the 2006 Air New Zealand Cup and earned a contract with the Highlanders for the 2007 Super 14 season. He made 5 starts in 2007 and looked to have a bright future for the franchise until a serious knee injury derailed his career and forced him to miss all of 2008.

Australia

After an extended injury break, Taylor signed with the Queensland Reds for the 2009 Super 14 season He appeared in 14 matches over two seasons for the Reds and scored his first Super Rugby try.

Europe

Taylor signed with Connacht of the Celtic League for the 2010–11 season. He then came in as injury cover for Worcester Warriors in December 2011, but two minutes after making his debut was injured and ruled out for the rest of the 2011/12 season.

International

Taylor made himself available to play for Samoa in the run-up to the 2011 Rugby World Cup and made his debut against Japan on 2 July 2011.

Return to Otago

Taylor returned to New Zealand and signed with the Otago Rugby Football Union for the 2013 ITM Cup season.

References

External links
Reds Profile

 Australian rugby union players
New Zealand rugby union players
1983 births
Living people
Samoa international rugby union players
Australian emigrants to New Zealand
Australian sportspeople of Samoan descent
New Zealand sportspeople of Samoan descent
Highlanders (rugby union) players
Queensland Reds players
Otago rugby union players
Connacht Rugby players
Worcester Warriors players
Rugby union flankers